Harmony is a town in Van Buren Township, Clay County, Indiana, United States. The population was 656 at the 2010 census. It is part of the Terre Haute Metropolitan Statistical Area.

History
Harmony was platted in 1864, although there had long been a small settlement at the site.

Coal Company Store was listed on the National Register of Historic Places between 1986 and 1992.

Geography

Demographics

2010 census
As of the census of 2010, there were 656 people, 265 households, and 176 families living in the town. The racial makeup of the town was 97.6% White, 0.8% African American, 0.3% Asian, 0.9% from other races, and 0.5% from two or more races. Hispanic or Latino of any race were 1.2% of the population.

There were 265 households, of which 34.7% had children under the age of 18 living with them, 48.3% were married couples living together, 13.2% had a female householder with no husband present, 4.9% had a male householder with no wife present, and 33.6% were non-families. 30.2% of all households were made up of individuals, and 12.4% had someone living alone who was 65 years of age or older. The average household size was 2.48 and the average family size was 3.04.

The median age in the town was 38.6 years. 25.2% of residents were under the age of 18; 9.4% were between the ages of 18 and 24; 25% were from 25 to 44; 27% were from 45 to 64; and 13.6% were 65 years of age or older. The gender makeup of the town was 45.3% male and 54.7% female.

2000 census
According to the census of 2000, there were 589 people, 241 households, and 160 families living in the town. The racial makeup of the town was 97.62% White, 0.17% African American, 0.34% Asian, 0.51% from other races, and 1.36% from two or more races.

There were 241 households, out of which 34.4% had children under the age of 18 living with them, 52.3% were married couples living together, 11.2% had a female householder with no husband present, and 33.6% were non-families. 27.8% of all households were made up of individuals, and 10.8% had someone living alone who was 65 years of age or older. The average household size was 2.44 and the average family size was 2.99.

In the town, the population was spread out, with 28.2% under the age of 18, 8.3% from 18 to 24, 27.8% from 25 to 44, 22.1% from 45 to 64, and 13.6% who were 65 years of age or older. The median age was 35 years. For every 100 females, there were 82.9 males. For every 100 females age 18 and over, there were 83.1 males.

The median income for a household in the town was $33,438, and the median income for a family was $41,750. Males had a median income of $31,406 versus $21,333 for females. The per capita income for the town was $16,276. About 7.2% of families and 8.2% of the population were below the poverty line, including 12.2% of those under age 18 and 8.0% of those age 65 or over.

References

Towns in Clay County, Indiana
Towns in Indiana
Terre Haute metropolitan area